The Center for Women in Mathematics, a part of the Smith College Department of Mathematics and Statistics, is an American educational program founded in 2007 to increase the involvement of women in mathematics. The Center aims for students to engage in coursework and research in a mathematical environment that actively supports women.

Junior Program 
The Junior Program is designed for undergraduate women who wish to spend a year or a semester studying mathematics at a women's college.  Financial aid funding is provided by the National Science Foundation.

Post-Baccalaureate Program 
The Post-Baccalaureate Program is geared towards women with bachelor's degrees who didn't major in mathematics as undergraduates or whose major was light. The post-baccalaureate program is funded through grants from Smith College and the National Science Foundation and students receive tuition waivers and living stipends.

Students of both programs are able to take classes not only at Smith College, but also at any other of the Five Colleges - Amherst, Mt. Holyoke and Hampshire Colleges and UMass Amherst, the last of which also offers graduate-level courses.

WIMIN Conference 
Each year the Center hosts the Women in Mathematics in New England (WIMIN) Conference. The conference features two plenary lectures given by prominent female mathematicians: the Dorothy Wrinch Lecture in Biomathematics, and the Alice Dickinson Lecture in Mathematics. It also features short talks by undergraduate and graduate students (of any gender), and a panel intended for students considering graduate studies.

Past Plenary Speakers

Notes

Sources
 Center for Women in Mathematics Brochure

External links

 Center for Women in Mathematics at Smith College
Women in Mathematics in New England
Smith College website

Smith College
Women and education
United States educational programs
Women in mathematics